The H. Carl Moultrie Courthouse is a courthouse of the Superior Court of the District of Columbia located at 500 Indiana Avenue NW, in the Judiciary Square neighborhood of Washington, D.C.

History
It was named after former Chief Judge H. Carl Moultrie I. Judge Moultrie was appointed an associate judge in 1972 and chief judge on June 22, 1978. He remained chief judge  until he died on April 9, 1986.

In August 1978, heavy rain resulted in a roof leak because the roof drains could not handle the volume of rainwater.

References

External links

Courthouses in Washington, D.C.
1970s architecture in the United States
Government buildings completed in 1976
Judiciary Square
Modernist architecture in Washington, D.C.